Poonam Bajwa is an Indian actress and model who appears in Tamil, Malayalam, Telugu and Kannada films. She made her acting debut in 2005 with the Telugu film Modati Cinema, after that she was featured in more Telugu film, such as Boss (2006). Her debut Tamil movie was Seval (2008).

Early life and education
A Punjabi  by birth, she was born in Bombay to Amarjit Singh Bajwa, a Naval Officer and Jayalakshmi Bajwa. She has a younger sister, Deepika Bajwa. She was crowned Miss Pune in 2005, after which she started modeling part-time while studying. When she went to Hyderabad for a ramp show, the director of Modati Cinema spotted her and asked her if she was interested in films. She had finished her 12th then and had a five-month gap before college and hence agreed to star in his film, despite excelling in academics. She pursued a degree in English Literature from Symbiosis International University, Pune.

Personal life 
In October 2020 Bajwa took to Instagram to announce she is in a relationship with director Suneel Reddy.

Acting career
She made her acting debut in the 2005 Telugu film Modati Cinema, following which she appeared in several Telugu films, including Boss opposite Nagarjuna and Bhaskar's Parugu. She debuted in Tamil in 2008 with the Hari-directed masala film Seval and subsequently starred in Thenavattu and Kacheri Arambam, both co-starring Jeeva, and Drohi and Thambikottai. She acted in China Town, a Malayalam movie.

Filmography

References

External links
 

Living people
Actresses in Malayalam cinema
Actresses from Mumbai
Indian film actresses
Actresses in Tamil cinema
Punjabi people
21st-century Indian actresses
Actresses in Telugu cinema
Actresses in Kannada cinema
Year of birth missing (living people)